The 2019 National People's Congress, or the Second Session of the 13th National People's Congress, was held in March 2019 at the Great Hall of the People in Beijing, China. The session opened on 8 March and concluded on 20 March. Major state positions were elected in this session.

The work report of the 13th NPC Standing Committee was delivered by Li Zhanshu, chairman of the Standing Committee of the National People's Congress. The explanation on the draft foreign investment law during the meeting was delivered by Wang Chen, vice chairman of the National People's Congress (NPC) Standing Committee.

In Premier Li's work report, the 2019 GDP growth target was lowered to a 6-6.5 per cent range due to the US-China trade war, an already high debt level and financing bottlenecks for private enterprises. Among the solutions suggested in Li's report included tax and fees cuts, stabilisation of employment and more social services. The Premier's report was approved with 2,945 votes in favour and three abstentions.

The NPC announced a defense budget spending increase of 7.5%.

Legislation and resolutions

References

External links

March 2019 events in China
National People's Congresses